Last Train Home is the sixteenth studio album by British hard rock band Foghat. The album was released on 15 June 2010, under the band's independent music label Foghat Records.

Critical reception

Since its release, Last Train Home has been met with mostly positive reviews from critics. Steven Erlewine of Allmusic gave the album three stars out of a possible five, and said that Foghat "play with a considerable amount of energy and a precision that only a veteran touring band could have, making this a nice little surprise for hardcore fans".

Track listing
"Born for the Road" (Bryan Bassett) – 4:59
"Needle & Spoon" (Chris Youlden) – 3:46
"So Many Roads, So Many Trains" (Otis Rush) – 4:50
"Last Train Home" (Bassett) – 4:22
"Shake Your Money Maker" (Elmore James) – 4:38
"It Hurts Me Too" (Elmore James) – 5:59
"Feel So Bad" (Chuck Willis) – 4:39
"Louisiana Blues" (Muddy Waters) – 4:43
"495 Boogie" (Bassett / Lefty "Sugar Lips" Lefkowitz) – 3:55
"Rollin' & Tumblin' / You Need Love" (Willie Dixon) – 8:12
"In My Dreams" (Eddie Kirkland) – 5:42
"Good Good Day" (Eddie Kirkland) – 4:30

Personnel
Bryan Bassett – guitar, slide guitar, vocals
Colin Earl – keyboards
Roger Earl – drums, vocals
Jeff Howell – bass guitar, vocals
Charlie Huhn – guitar, vocals
Eddie Kirkland – guitar, vocals
Lefty "Sugar Lips" Lefkowitz – harmonica

References

2010 albums
Foghat albums